"Really Big Shrimp" is a television special for the Nickelodeon sitcom Drake & Josh. The episode first aired on August 3, 2007, and was Nickelodeon's highest-rated television event at that time, with 5.8 million viewers.

Plot
At a music showcase at the Premiere movie theater, Drake (Drake Bell) performs his new song "Makes Me Happy" for a music deal from record producer Alan Krim (mentioned in the series' first television film) and he succeeds. While at Spin City Records, they agree to put Drake's song in a commercial for the Daka Shoe Company's "Air Puffs" line that will air during the Super Bowl. Meanwhile, Helen (Yvette Nicole Brown) is getting married to Buzz Baxter and, with many of her family members staying in her apartment, her grandmother Lula comes to stay at the Parker-Nichols home for a week, forcing Drake and Josh (Josh Peck) to share their room with Megan (Miranda Cosgrove) due to Lula staying in hers instead of the guest room (since Walter has a train set in the guest room as mentioned in "The Great Dohney"). In retaliation for this, Megan redecorates her brothers' room in a girly style, confines them to a single mattress in a corner with only a lamp and a football accompanying it, threatens to accuse them of vandalizing their neighbors' gazebo if they complain about this to their parents, and invites her friends to hang out with her in the room. To save money for her upcoming honeymoon, Helen makes a deal with Craig and Eric to videotape her wedding.

Helen then promotes the Premiere's latest employee and Josh's ex-girlfriend, Mindy Crenshaw (Allison Scagliotti), as its new assistant manager for fixing a corn dog rotisserie that Josh was unable to fix. Josh is distraught over not getting the position and accuses Mindy of constantly trying to do better than him, which she denies. While at the recording studio for Drake's song, Josh is given a contract from Krim to sign that he fails to read, as the company's served prawns distract him, and he inadvertently signs the creative rights to Drake's song away. An auto-tuned "bubblegum pop" remix of the song that Drake is not pleased with is soon developed by Krim. Learning about the contract and Josh's involvement in it, a furious Drake bitterly fires him as his manager for his blundering and attempts to get revenge on Krim as well as acting cold to Josh. While criticizing Josh for always playing by the rules, Drake tells him that, "when people play dirty, sometimes you have to play dirty back". 

Attempting to fix his mistake, Josh returns to Spin City Records. After being told Daka Shoes will not use the song's original version on the Super Bowl commercial and will use the Krim auto-tuned remix instead, Josh decides to take Drake's words to heart and switches the remix with the original as it is being picked up. The plan succeeds and the original version of the song plays on the commercial, much to the delight of Drake, who finally forgives his brother, but it comes with a price. Right after the commercial airs, Josh receives a call from Krim, who informs him that his switching of the songs has violated the contract and Spin City plans to sue the duo for $50,000,000 with the possibility of a prison sentence.

While at work as Drake gets a call, Mindy panics as Crazy Steve has gone insane, having been mistakenly scheduled on a Monday, which, according to Helen, is "his bad day". Josh manages to calm him down by singing "She'll Be Coming 'Round the Mountain" and telling him to have some milk, for which a hesitant Helen finally appreciates his good work. In spite of how Josh managed to handle this situation better than her, Mindy then confesses to Josh that she did not take the assistant manager job because she needed extra money or to do better than him at all; she did it because she wanted to spend more time with him, having always regretted breaking up with him. Drake and Josh then go to Spin City Records for a stern talking-to with Krim about switching the remix with the original CD, but as they are prepared to face the consequences, company president Nick Mateo says that Drake's song has become a number one hit and extremely popular with 30,000 emails and phone calls from fans wishing to buy it, and dozens of downloads of it crashing their website's server. The charges against the duo are dropped, much to their delight, and an outraged Krim is fired by Mateo for his actions into messing Drake's song and tricking Josh into it.

At Helen's wedding, Craig mistakenly plugs his equipment into a faulty plug after Eric tells him to, which causes a fire that sets the Premiere ablaze. Helen is disappointed at her wedding being ruined, but Josh convinces her that weddings are about two people who love each other getting together surrounded by the people who love them. The wedding soon resumes in the parking lot, where Josh and Mindy get back together. Mindy has quit her job and Helen finally gives Josh the assistant manager position as his reward for his years of hard work. Drake then performs his song to the crowd, dedicating it to the newlyweds as well as Josh, rehiring him as his manager in the process.

Drake and Josh later return home to find their room restored to its former state as Lula finally moved as well as prawns sent over from Mateo. Megan and her friends have eaten all but one, which causes the duo to fight over it, mirroring a popular scene from The Amanda Show, featuring Drake Bell and Josh Peck fighting over a piece of shrimp, thus ending the series with the same way that Bell and Peck had their first great success together.

Cast
 Drake Bell as Drake Parker: the stepbrother of Josh and brother of Megan. He is working on his debut album in this episode.
 Josh Peck as Josh Nichols: the stepbrother of Drake and Megan and also Drake's manager. He switches the remix of Drake's song with the original version.
 Miranda Cosgrove as Megan Parker: the sister of Drake and the stepsister of Josh. She moves into Drake and Josh's room while Helen's grandmother, Lula, is staying in hers. She takes up most of the room by redecorating it to her liking.
 Nancy Sullivan as Audrey Parker-Nichols: the mother of Drake and Megan, the stepmother of Josh, and the wife of Walter.
 Jonathan Goldstein as Walter Nichols: the stepfather of Drake and Megan, the father of Josh, and the husband of Audrey.
 Allison Scagliotti as Mindy Crenshaw: Josh's ex-girlfriend and the assistant manager at the premiere. She takes the job because she wanted to spend more time with Josh, having always regretted breaking up with him. She later quits and the assistant manager position is given to Josh.
 Jerry Trainor as Crazy Steve: A crazy employee at the Premiere known for shouting. He is taking anger management in this episode.
 Yvette Nicole Brown as Helen Dubois: A bride-to-be and the manager of the Premiere. She gets married later in the episode and gives Josh the assistant manager position.
 Scott Halberstadt as Eric Blonnowitz: Craig's best friend who is frequently mistaken for the former by Drake. He and Craig videotape Helen's wedding.
 Alec Medlock as Craig Ramirez: Eric's best friend. He and Eric videotape Helen's wedding..
 Cathy Shim as Leah: an employee at the Premiere. She is frequently scared of Crazy Steve due to his outbursts.
 Jasmine McNeal as Janie: a friend of Megan who dislikes her brothers.
 Alysse Cepeda as Molly: friend of Megan and Janie who hits on Josh, much to her other friends' disgust.
 Brenda Vivian as Collete: an employee at Spin City Records.
 Joseph Will as Alan Krim: The vice president of Spin City Records who plans to profit off of Drake's song by developing a remix that Drake is not pleased with. When Josh switches the remix with the original version, Krim threatens to have him and Drake incarcerated for this, but the song becomes a number one hit and he is fired for his actions by the company's CEO, Nick Matteo, much to his chagrin.
 Jay Bontatibus as Nick Matteo: the CEO of Spin City Records. He wants to make Drake's song a hit and later fires Krim for his attempts at profiting off it.

Production
The episode aired on August 3, 2007 during Drake vs. Josh weekend and was intended to be the series finale. However, Nickelodeon did not air the final episodes chronologically and aired the episodes Helicopter and Dance Contest after the airing of the finale. They were aired in the wrong order with no stated reason. Promotion for Really Big Shrimp included a live competition between Drake Bell and Josh Peck in 5 shrimp-based challenges; Drake won with 3 out of 5 challenges.

Music
Drake Bell made a music video to "Makes Me Happy", and it became the single for the episode.

Reception
Laura Fries of Variety was mostly positive on Really Big Shrimp, stating that "...Drake and Josh perfectly embody the goofy, unabashed fun that too few remember..." and complimented the two leads on their appeal, but complained that "...[Miranda] Cosgrove's sister Megan is an immensely irritating character."

It was the most watched television event on Nickelodeon up to that time, with 5.8 million viewers. It was the most watched Nickelodeon program until the iCarly film, iGo to Japan, broke the record. The record was later broken again by Merry Christmas, Drake & Josh.

References

External links
 

2007 American television episodes
2007 television films
2007 films
Drake & Josh episodes
Films directed by Steve Hoefer